Röntgental (in German Bahnhof Röntgental) is a railway station in the village of Röntgental, Germany, part of the municipality of Panketal. It is served by the Berlin S-Bahn.

References

External links

Station information 

Berlin S-Bahn stations
Railway stations in Brandenburg
Buildings and structures in Barnim
Railway stations in Germany opened in 1903